The 2021–22 season is New Basket Brindisi's 30th in existence and the club's 4th consecutive season in the top tier of Italian basketball.

Kit 
Supplier: Adidas / Sponsor: Happy Casa

Players

Current roster
Two captains were appointed for the season: Zanelli was the captain for the Serie A matches, while Chappell for the Champions League.

Depth chart

Squad changes

In 

|}

Out 

|}

Confirmed 

|}

Coach

Competitions

Supercup

Serie A

Basketball Champion League

Regular season

References 

2021–22 Basketball Champions League
2021–22 in Italian basketball by club
New Basket Brindisi